Všešportový areál ("All Sports Complex") was a multi-purpose stadium in Košice, Slovakia. In its 21 years operating as a professional football ground, the Czechoslovakia national football team, then the independent Slovakia national football team, and local club FC VSS Košice played home matches there from 1976 to 1997.

History
The Všešportový areál stadium opened on 29 February 1976 with a match against ZVL Žilina. The football stadium was demolished in 2011. The stadium was primarily used for football matches and held 30,312 spectators. It hosted six matches for the Czechoslovakia and four times for the independent Slovakia. VSS Košice, later renamed to ZŤS and 1. FC Košice, played there until 1997, moving to the renovated Štadión Lokomotívy. The complex also consisted of several football training grounds, basketball, handball and wrestling indoor arenas.

New stadium
The club planned construction of a new stadium holding 20,000 spectators in a neighbourhood of older Všešportový areál stadium. The estimated cost of the stadium was €28 million. In 2017 club went to bankruptcy and new stadium Košická futbalová aréna was built by city of Košice and Slovak government in 2022.

International matches
Všešportový areál hosted one friendly and three competitive matches of the Slovakia national football team.

References

Defunct football venues in Slovakia
Multi-purpose stadiums in Slovakia
Buildings and structures in Košice Region
Sport in Košice
Sports venues completed in 1976
Sports venues demolished in 2011
1976 establishments in Czechoslovakia
2011 disestablishments in Slovakia